According to the Guinness World Records, a world record is usually the best global and most important performance that is ever recorded and officially verified in a specific skill, sport, or other kind of activity. The book Guinness World Records and other world records organizations collates and publishes notable records of many. One of them is the World Records Union that is the unique world records register organization recognized by the Council of the Notariats of the European Union.

Terminology 
In the United States, the form World's Record was formerly more common. The term The World's Best was also briefly in use. The latter term is still used in athletics events, including track and field and road running to describe good and bad performances that are not recognized as an official world record: either because it is not an event where the IAAF tracks the record (e.g. the 150 m run or individual events in a decathlon), or because it does not fulfill other rigorous criteria of an otherwise qualifying event (e.g. the Great North Run half-marathon, which has an excessive downhill gradient). The term is also used in video game speedrunning for the fastest achieved time in the game and category.

Culture 
Malaysia is one country where world record-breaking has become something of a national fad. In India, the setting and breaking of records is also popular.

Sports 
Some sports have world records recognised by their respective sports governing bodies:

List of One Day International cricket records
List of world records in athletics
List of junior world records in athletics
List of world records in masters athletics
List of world youth bests in athletics
List of IPC world records in athletics
List of world records in canoeing
List of world records in chess
List of cycling records
List of world records in track cycling
List of world records in finswimming
List of world records in juggling
List of world records in rowing
List of world records in speed skating
List of world records in swimming
List of IPC world records in swimming
List of world records in Olympic weightlifting
List of world records in drama

See also 
 Lists of extreme points

References

Records (superlatives)